Night Things is the fifteenth studio album by American country music artist Ed Bruce. It was released in 1986 via RCA Records. The album includes the singles "Nights", "Fool for Each Other" and "Quietly Crazy".

Track listing

Chart performance

References

1986 albums
Ed Bruce albums
RCA Records albums